Gregory Roland Luer (born 6 December 1994) is an English professional footballer who plays as a forward for  club Eastbourne Borough.

He began his career in non-league football with Hove Rivervale, Whitehawk, Eastbourne Borough, and Burgess Hill Town, before earning a move to Hull City in January 2015. He was loaned out to Port Vale the following month, and in the 2015–16 season was loaned out to Scunthorpe United and Stevenage. He joined Maidstone United on loan for the latter part of the 2017–18 season. Following his release from Hull, he joined Woking in July 2018. He signed with Eastbourne Borough in June 2019.

Career

Early career
Luer had played non-League football for Hove Rivervale, Whitehawk and Eastbourne Borough, before he was spotted playing Isthmian League football for Burgess Hill Town by Hull scout Dean White. Burgess manager Ian Chapman handed him his debut at age 17, and recommended him to his former club Brighton & Hove Albion.

Hull City
He was signed by Premier League club Hull City in January 2015. Later that month he was loaned out to League One side Port Vale. He made his debut in the English Football League at Vale Park on 7 February, coming on for Richard Duffy 86 minutes into a 2–2 draw with Bradford City. He returned to Hull after only one further substitute appearance.

Luer made his debut for Hull City on the opening day of the 2015–16 season when he came on as a substitute for Chuba Akpom in a 2–0 win over Huddersfield Town at the KC Stadium. He scored his first goal for the "Tigers" in the League Cup on 11 August, scoring in a 2–2 draw with Accrington Stanley, and then went on to convert the opening penalty of Hull's subsequent penalty shoot-out victory. He scored the only goal of the following round two weeks later to take Hull through at home to Rochdale.

On 9 February 2016, Luer moved to League One side Scunthorpe United on a month-long loan spell. He made one start and three substitute appearances for the "Iron", before returning to Hull City despite reports that Scunthorpe manager Nick Daws was looking to extend the loan deal. On 12 March 2016, Luer moved on a month-long loan to League Two side Stevenage. He impressed in his first five games for the club and the loan deal was extended until the end of the 2015–16 season. He made one appearance during the 2016–17 season, playing the first 57 minutes of a 3–1 victory over Exeter City in the EFL Cup second round before he was sidelined with a knee injury picked up during the game.

Speaking in January 2018, Luer said that the arrival of new manager Nigel Adkins had given him a fresh start at the club, as he made a cameo appearance in Adkins's first game in charge and went on to score a hat-trick for the reserves. On 19 March 2018, Luer moved on loan to National League side Maidstone United until the end of the 2017–18 season. He was released by Hull at the end of the 2017–18 season.

Woking
On 14 July 2018, Luer signed with National League South club Woking after impressing manager Alan Dowson over a trial period. On 7 August 2018, Luer made his Woking debut during their 2–1 home victory over St Albans City, featuring for 72 minutes before being replaced by Paul Hodges. A month later, he went onto score his first goal for the club during a 1–1 draw with Concord Rangers, opening the scoring in the 29th minute. Following a slow start, with only one goal in fourteen league games, Luer went onto net Woking's third in a 3–1 home win over rivals, Hampton & Richmond Borough and scored a hat-trick in their reverse fixture six days later. He ended the 2018–19 season with nine goals in 39 appearances, though was not in the matchday squad as the "Cardinals" secured promotion with victory over Welling United in the play-off final.

Eastbourne Borough
On 19 June 2019, Luer rejoined Eastbourne Borough; "Sports" manager Lee Bradbury admitted he tried to sign Luer whilst manager of Havant & Waterlooville in the previous season. He scored 11 goals in 38 appearances during the 2019–20 season and scored five goals in 22 games in the 2020–21 season. Both campaigns were ended early due to the COVID-19 pandemic in England. He made 43 appearances in the 2021–22 campaign, scoring six goals, featuring once in the play-offs as a substitute. He agreed a new contract in the summer.

Career statistics

References

External links

Living people
1994 births
Footballers from Brighton
English footballers
Association football forwards
Whitehawk F.C. players
Eastbourne Borough F.C. players
Burgess Hill Town F.C. players
Hull City A.F.C. players
Port Vale F.C. players
Scunthorpe United F.C. players
Stevenage F.C. players
Maidstone United F.C. players
Woking F.C. players
Isthmian League players
English Football League players
National League (English football) players